Shae Dupuy is a Canadian country singer and songwriter. She has released two EPs: Breakdown in 2014 and Brave in 2016. Her third studio EP is expected to release in Fall 2022. 		 	

Dupuy was nominated for the "Rising Star" award at the 2022 Country Music Association of Ontario (CMAO) Awards. Additionally, she was nominated for the "Creative Director(s) of the Year" category at the 2021 Canadian Country Music Association (CCMA) Awards. Her song Tin Man hit #2 in Italy and #10 in Russia on the iTunes Country Music Chart.

Career

Breakdown EP (2014 to 2015) 
Dupuy began her career as a recording artist in 2014, releasing her debut single, Grandpa’s Truck, and her debut EP, Breakdown, in June of that year. Both the single and EP attracted the attention of Country Music Television Canada (CMT), which named her its "Fresh Face Artist" for October 2014. In 2015, Dupuy opened for Dallas Smith and Jess Moskaluke at the Music In The Fields festival.

Brave EP (2016 to 2019) 
Brave, Dupuy's second EP, was released in October 2016. Jeff Johnson and Jason Barry produced the EP.

In 2018, Dupuy performed across Canada as part of her "Let The Good Times Roll" tour to promote Brave. She made stops in Ontario, Quebec, British Columbia, Alberta, Nova Scotia, New Brunswick, and Prince Edward Island, including a performance at the Cavendish Beach Music Festival. Supporting acts included Kris Barclay, Nicole Sumerlyn, and Aaron Pollock. Dupuy was also a featured opener for Cold Creek County during their 2018 tour.

Upcoming Third EP (2020 to Present) 
By 2019, Dupuy relocated to Nashville to collaborate with some of the top songwriters in country music on a full-time basis. In 2020, the singles Hesitate, Black and White, and Selfish were released ahead of Dupuy's third EP, which is expected to release in Fall 2022.

Award Nominations 
Dupuy was nominated for the "Rising Star" category at the 2016, 2018, and 2022 Country Music Association of Ontario (CMAO) Awards. Dupuy's music video for Drink About It was nominated for the "Music Video of the Year" category at the 2016 CMAO Awards as well. Additionally, following the success of her #strongisbeautiful campaign on Instagram, Dupuy was nominated for the "Interactive Artist of Group of the Year" category at the 2017 Canadian Country Music Association (CCMA) Awards. In 2021, Dupuy, along with Ceci Mula, received a CCMA nomination in the "Creative Director(s) of the Year" category for her single, music video, and promotional material for her song Selfish.

Discography

EPs

Singles

Music Videos

Lyric Videos

Awards and nominations

References

Canadian women country singers
Canadian country songwriters
Living people
1995 births
21st-century Canadian women singers